Alan Wilkins may refer to:
 Alan Wilkins (cricketer) (born 1953), former English county cricketer and sports commentator
 Alan Wilkins (playwright) (1969-2022), Scottish playwright